Gambale is a surname. Notable people with the surname include:
 Ambra Gambale, South African and Italian artist and jewellery designer
 Diego Gambale, (born 1998), Italian footballer
 Frank Gambale (born 1958), Australian jazz guitarist
 Mary Gambale (born 1988), American tennis player
  (born 1964), Italian politician